Francisco Chagas Eloia (born 17 February 1955 in Brazil), known as just Eloi, is a Brazilian retired footballer.

References

Brazilian footballers
1955 births
Living people
Association football midfielders
Associação Portuguesa de Desportos players
Associação Atlética Internacional (Limeira) players
America Football Club (Rio de Janeiro) players
Nacional Futebol Clube players
Ceará Sporting Club players
Fortaleza Esporte Clube players
Fluminense FC players
Louletano D.C. players
Boavista F.C. players
Genoa C.F.C. players
FC Porto players
Botafogo de Futebol e Regatas players
CR Vasco da Gama players